Louis-René Beaudoin,  (May 5, 1912 – February 21, 1970) was Speaker of the House of Commons of Canada from 1953 to 1957.

Though trained as a lawyer, Beaudoin came from a working class background and financed his education by working as a bus driver and labourer. He became a legal advisor to the Quebec Federation of Labour and volunteered for the Quebec Liberal Party prior to winning election to Parliament. He founded a law firm in Montreal with Maurice Riel during the 1950s under the name Beaudoin, Riel, Geoffrion & Vermette now known as Dunton Rainville.

Beadouin was first elected to the House of Commons of Canada in the 1945 election as a Liberal from Quebec. He became Deputy Speaker in 1952 and was appointed Speaker of the House of Commons on November 12, 1953.

Beaudoin's nomination was seconded by Leader of the Opposition George Drew. His reputation as a competent Speaker grew until the Pipeline Debate in 1956 in which the government invoked closure repeatedly in an attempt to force legislation through the house and force a vote with a minimum of debate.

In the course of the debate, Beaudoin initially ruled that debate could occur on an appeal of a ruling by the Deputy Speaker. The next day, Beaudoin reversed his ruling and moved that the vote on the appeal proceed without debate. The Opposition was outraged and a number of Members of Parliament (MPs) stormed the Chair, calling the Speaker a "traitor" and "coward".

The following Monday, George Drew introduced a motion of censure against Beaudoin whom he accused of destroying the Speakership. The Liberal majority defeated the motion, but less than a month later, Mr. Drew called attention to a newspaper in which there was a letter by Beaudoin criticizing the behaviour of opposition members during the pipeline debate. Beaudoin argued it was a private letter, not intended to be published. The following day, however, he placed his resignation before the House. Prime Minister Louis St. Laurent was out of the country, but on returning, he persuaded Mr. Beaudoin to stay on until the end of the Parliament.

Beaudoin's reputation was destroyed. While he was re-elected to the House in the 1957 election, he had lost interest in political life and did not contest the 1958 election.

After obtaining a Reno, Nevada  divorce from his wife of 21 years, he married Alice Margaret Outram, 24 years his junior, and moved to the United States. Briefly enrolled in a doctoral program at Columbia University, he left without finishing his thesis and spent the remainder of his life drifting from job to job, eventually finding work as a bartender at Freddy's Tavern in Tempe, Arizona. In 1964 his second marriage failed and the following year he returned to Canada. For part of 1965 he taught high school French at Morin Heights High School in the Quebec Laurentians.

In February 1970 he died aged 57 of a heart attack, "virtually penniless and alone, in the back seat of a Montreal taxi."

References

 Speakers of the Canadian House of Commons biography

Archives 
There is a Louis-René Beaudoin fonds at Library and Archives Canada. Archival reference number is R3298.

External links
 
Maloney, Mark. "A tragic, shocking fall from grace", Toronto Star, February 27, 2007.
The Gazette, May 24, 1958.

1912 births
1970 deaths
French Quebecers
Lawyers from Montreal
Liberal Party of Canada MPs
Members of the House of Commons of Canada from Quebec
Members of the King's Privy Council for Canada
Politicians from Montreal
Speakers of the House of Commons of Canada